Alex Gerrard (born 5 November 1991) is a rugby league footballer who plays as a  and  for the Salford Red Devils in the Betfred Super League.

He has previously played for the Widnes Vikings in the Championship and Super League, and on loan from Widnes at the North Wales Crusaders in League 1. Gerrard has also played for the Mackay Cutters in the Queensland Cup.

He made his début for the first team in the 2010 Challenge Cup 5th round tie against the Wigan Warriors.

References

External links
Leigh Centurions profile 
Widnes Vikings profile
SL profile

1991 births
Living people
English rugby league players
Leigh Leopards players
Mackay Cutters players
North Wales Crusaders players
Rugby league players from Wigan
Rugby league props
Salford Red Devils players
Widnes Vikings players